Giuseppe D'Angelo (born November 17, 1951) is an Italian retired slalom canoeist who competed in the early-to-mid 1970s. He finished 18th in the K-1 event at the 1972 Summer Olympics in Munich. He was born in Ivrea.

References

1951 births
Canoeists at the 1972 Summer Olympics
Italian male canoeists
Living people
Olympic canoeists of Italy
People from Ivrea
Sportspeople from the Metropolitan City of Turin
20th-century Italian people